The 1826 Illinois gubernatorial election was the third quadrennial election for this office.  Former Territorial Governor Ninian Edwards was elected with a 49% plurality. State senator Thomas Sloo, Jr. came in second and Former Lieutenant Governor Adolphus Hubbard came in third.

Results

References
Illinois Blue Book 1899

Illinois
1826
Gubernatorial
August 1826 events